Camp Creek Falls is a  waterfall that flows from Camp Creek on a basin of about 4 square miles and 1550 feet above sea level, located in the U.S. state of Washington. Shortly downstream Camp Creek empties into Cispus River. While flow is reduced in the late season, Camp Creek is a perennial drop with two tiers clearly visible. Camp Creek Falls is located south of U.S. Route 12 in the heart of the Mount St. Helens National Volcanic Monument. A hiking trail leads from a parking area to the falls.

Location 
Camp Creek Falls is located in the heart of White Pass/Cowlitz River Valley, 9.5 miles south of Randle, Washington along Randle-Troute Lake road (NF-23). Access is found past Pinto Rd (NF-28) fork on the left (north) side of the road. The Randle-Troute Lake road crosses over Camp Creek which empties into Cispus River located a short walk south of NF-23 at the same location. After crossing over Camp Creek, the trail hikes through a mixed conifer hardwood forest along a steep side slope on both sides of the watercourse before ending approximately 20 feet of the waterfall.

See also 
 List of waterfalls in Washington

Notes

Waterfalls of Washington (state)
Waterfalls of Skamania County, Washington
Tiered waterfalls